Hall High is a neighborhood located in the central portion of Little Rock, Arkansas. It is a largely residential area to the west of Pulaski Heights, and south of Tanglewood.  Named for the city's Hall High School, the neighborhood is also widely considered as a part of the greater midtown section of Little Rock. The neighborhood is also home to the Catholic High School for Boys.

Though northern and southern boundaries of the neighborhood are less distinct, heavily traveled Mississippi and University avenues generally are considered as western and eastern boundaries, respectively.  H Street and Evergreen Drive are among the busier streets carrying traffic between the two avenues.  Homes built in Hall High generally date from years following World War II, contrasting with the more historic Pulaski Heights area.

Neighborhoods in Little Rock, Arkansas